Tamara Arciuch (born 24 March 1975 in Skierniewice) is a Polish actress.

She has danced on the Polish version of TV programme Dancing with the Stars.

Filmography
2011: Och, Karol – Agata
2010: Lincz – Attorney Łubieńska
2010: M jak Miłość – Anna Gruszyńska
2010: Ojciec Mateusz – Mayor of Sandomierz Justyna Malec
2010: Operacja Reszka – Jasnowłosa
2009: Złoty środek – Wiktoria
2008: Mniejsze zło – Doctor
2008: Trzeci oficer – Stella
2008: Nie kłam, kochanie
2007: Halo Hans! – Beautiful Girl
2006: Oficerowie – Stella
2005: Niania (Polish version The Nanny – Karolina Łapińska
2005-2007: Egzamin z życia – Prostitute
2004-2008: Pierwsza miłość – Mrs. Iwonka
2004: Długi weekend – Felusi's Mother
2004-2008: Kryminalni – Actor
2004-2005: Oficer – Stella Lewandowska
2004: Camera Café – Wife
2004: The Wedding – Kasia
2002-2003: Psie serce – Renata
2002-2003: Kasia and Tomek – Dentist
2000-2001: Adam and Ewa – Monika Rozdrażewska
2000: Anna Karenina – Princess Sorokina
2000: Sukces – Anetka Grudzińska
2000: Piotrek zgubił dziadka oko, a Jasiek chce dożyć spokojnej starości – Danka Dryblas
1999-2005: Lokatorzy – Anna Moc-Cieszkowska
1999: Tygrysy Europy – Ania
1999: Na dobre i na złe – Viola
1997: Młode wilki 1/2 – Agata (Anna's friend)

Personal life
She was married to Bernard Szyc. Together they have a son named Krzysztof. She has a son Michał (b. 2009) with her partner Bartłomiej Kasprzykowski.

References

External links
Tamara Arciuch at filmweb.pl
Tamara Arciuch at filmpolski.pl

1975 births
Living people
Polish film actresses
Polish television actresses
Polish stage actresses
People from Skierniewice
Polish actresses